Hongyuan Airport  is an airport serving Hongyuan County in Ngawa Tibetan and Qiang Autonomous Prefecture of Sichuan province, China. Construction started in July 2012, and the airport was opened on 28 August 2014.

Facilities
The airport has a 3,600-meter runway (class 4C) and a 3,600 square-meter terminal building.  It is projected to handle 350,000 passengers annually by 2020.

Airlines and destinations

See also
List of airports in China
List of the busiest airports in China
List of highest airports

References

Airports in Sichuan
Airports established in 2014
Ngawa Tibetan and Qiang Autonomous Prefecture
2014 establishments in China